Mircea Tuli (born 25 December 1957) is a Romanian weightlifter. He competed in the men's featherweight event at the 1984 Summer Olympics.

References

External links
 

1957 births
Living people
Romanian male weightlifters
Olympic weightlifters of Romania
Weightlifters at the 1984 Summer Olympics
People from Târnăveni
20th-century Romanian people
21st-century Romanian people